Saint-Yrieix-le-Déjalat is a commune in the Corrèze department in central France.

Etymology
Saint Yrieix (Aredius), who died in 591, was a contemporary of Gregory of Tours. In Attanum he founded a monastery that is the source of the walled city of Saint-Yrieix-la-Perche. He went to the tomb of St. Julien Brioude and brought the relics, and he went very often to pray at the tomb of St. Martin at Tours. He also built churches in honor of various saints he had gone for the relics.

Under the French Revolution, to follow a decree of the Convention, the town changed its name to Yrieix le Déjalat.

Mayors

Population

Sights
 Site de Franchesse
 Maison-Forte de Montamar
 Cascades des Pradeleix
 Croix sur la place (I.S.)

See also
Communes of the Corrèze department

References

External links

 Official site

Communes of Corrèze